The Rehoboth Beach Pirates were a minor league baseball team based in Rehoboth Beach, Delaware in 1947 and 1948. Rehoboth Beach teams played exclusively as members of the Class D level Eastern Shore League from 1947 to 1949. The Rehoboth Beach Pirates were a minor league affiliate of the Pittsburgh Pirates from 1947 to 1948. After the affiliation with the Pirates ended, the 1949 Rehoboth Beach Sea Hawks captured the Eastern Shore League championship in the league's final season of play. The teams played home minor league games at the Rehoboth Beach Ball Park.

History
Minor league baseball began in Rehoboth Beach, Delaware in 1947 with the franchise as a minor league affiliate of the Pittsburgh Pirates. The Rehoboth Beach Pirates were formed became members of the eight–team Class D level Eastern Shore League. The Cambridge Dodgers, Dover Phillies, Easton Yankees, Federalsburg A's, Milford Red Sox, Salisbury Cardinals and Seaford Eagles joined Rehoboth Beach in beginning league play on May 8, 1947. Rehoboth Beach replaced the Centreville Orioles franchise in the league.

In their first season of play, the Rehoboth Beach Pirates of the Eastern Shore League ended the 1947 season in 6th place. The Pirates finished the season with a record of 49–75, playing under managers Gordon McKinnon and Doug Peden. Rehoboth Beach finished 41.5 games behind the 1st place Cambridge Dodgers in the regular season standings. The Pirates did not qualify for the four-team playoffs won by the Seaford Eagles.

The 1948 Rehoboth Beach Pirates continued play as a Pittsburgh Pirates affiliate for a final season and the team ended the Eastern Shore League season with a record of 60–65. The Pirates placed 5th in the league standings, playing under manager returning manager Doug Peden. Rehoboth Beach finished 27.0 games behind the 1st place Salisbury Cardinals in the final regular season standings and did not qualify for the playoffs, won by the Milford Red Sox.

In their final Season of play, the Rehoboth Beach Sea Hawks won the Eastern Shore League championship. Playing under managers Bill Sisler and Johnny Watson, the Sea Hawks ended the 1949 Eastern Shore League season with a record of 56–63, placing 4th in the final standings and qualifying for the four–team playoffs. Rehoboth Beach finished 11.5 games behind the 1st place Easton Yankees in the regular season standings. After a round robin playoff series of the top four teams, the Rehoboth Beach Sea Hawks advanced to the finals with a 4–2 record. In the Finals, Rehoboth Beach defeated the Federalsburg Feds 4 games to 3 to win the final championship of the Eastern Shore League. The Eastern Shore League permanently folded after the 1949 season.

In their final game, the Game 7 victory over Federalsburg, it was reported that Sea Hawks' pitcher Les Wolf, coming off a 1–6 record with a 7.00 ERA in the regular season, threw a five–hit, complete game shutout to clinch the championship for Rehoboth Beach.

Rehoboth Beach, Delaware has not hosted another minor league team.

The ballpark
The Rehoboth Beach minor league teams reportedly played home games exclusively at Rehoboth Beach Ball Park. The ballpark had a noted capacity of 3,700 and was reportedly a new ballpark for the team, built at a cost of $91,000.

Timeline

Year–by–year record

Notable alumni

John Andre (1949)
Hal Bevan (1948)
Joe Muir (1947)
Johnny Watson (1949, MGR)

See also
Rehoboth Beach Pirates players
Rehoboth Beach Sea Hawks players

References

External links
Baseball Reference

Professional baseball teams in Delaware
Defunct baseball teams in Delaware
Baseball teams established in 1947
Baseball teams disestablished in 1948
Pittsburgh Pirates minor league affiliates
Defunct Eastern Shore League teams
Federalsburg, Maryland